In molecular biology, HTT antisense RNA 1 (non-protein coding), also known as HTT-AS1, is a long non-coding RNA. It is an antisense RNA which regulates the expression of the huntingtin gene.

See also
 Long noncoding RNA

References

Non-coding RNA